En Vivo Marzo 16 is a 1992 album by Franco De Vita released on the Sony label. The album is a concert recording made in Caracas, Venezuela, De Vita's birthplace. The title refers to the date of the recording on March 16, 1992. Two studio cuts were included on the disc: One of them, "No Lo Había Pensado," became a chart hit.

Track listing
 Introducción/Latino
 Te Equivocaste Conmigo
 Aqui Estás Otra Vez
 Esta Vez
 Somos Tres
 Te Amo
 Será
 Fantasía
 Louis
 Sólo Importas Tú
 Un Buen Perdedor
 No Hay Cielo
 Sexo
 No Basta
 No Lo Había Pensado
 Entre Tu Vida Y La Mía

Franco De Vita live albums
1992 live albums
Spanish-language live albums